Korwa, or Kodaku/Koraku (Korku), is a Munda language of India spoken in Chhattisgarh and Jharkhand.

Existing Korwa linguistic documentation includes Bahl (1962), which is based on the Korwa dialect of Dumertoli village, Bagicha Block, Tehsil Jashpurnagar, Raigarh District, Chhattisgarh.

Varieties
Korwa is a dialect continuum. The two principal varieties are Korwa (Korba) and Koraku (Kodaku), spoken by the Korwa and Kodaku respectively. Out of the Korwa, only the Hill Korwa still speak the language, the others having shifted to regional languages. The Kodaku in Jharkhand call their language "Korwa". Both speak Sadri, Kurukh, or Chhattisgarhi as a second language, or in the case of Sadri sometimes as their first language.

Gregory Anderson (2008:195) lists the following locations for Korowa and Koraku.
Korowa (Korwa) is spoken in northeastern Chhattisgarh state, including southern Surguja district, Jashpur district, parts of Raigarh district, and other neighboring areas. Korwa remains poorly documented, and the only documentation is in unpublished manuscripts.
Koraku is spoken in southern Mirzapur district of Uttar Pradesh and northern Surguja district of Chhattisgarh. It remains undocumented except for some kinship terms given in Singh & Danda (1986).

According to Singh & Danda (1986:1), "a Kodaku is very clear about the differences between himself and the Korwa and a clear-cut distinction is made when a Korwa asks a Kodaku about his tribe, and vice versa."

References

Anderson, Gregory D.S (ed). 2008. The Munda languages. Routledge Language Family Series 3.New York: Routledge. .
Bahl, Kali Charan. 1962. Korwa Lexicon. m.s., 148pp.
Singh, Bageshwar and Ajit K. Danda. 1986. The Kodaku of Surguja. Calcutta: Anthropological Survey of India.

Munda languages
Endangered languages of India